Antonio Valdés Herrera (1578 – 13 April 1657) was a Roman Catholic prelate who served as Bishop of Córdoba (1653–1657), Bishop of Osma (1641–1643), Bishop of Oviedo (1636–1641), and Bishop of Mondoñedo (1633–1636).

Biography
Antonio Valdés Herrera was born in Valladolid, Spain in 1578.
On 19 December 1633, he was appointed during the papacy of Pope Urban VIII as Bishop of Mondoñedo.
On 19 March 1634, he was consecrated bishop by Fernando Valdés Llano, Archbishop of Granada, with Juan Bravo Lagunas, Bishop Emeritus of Ugento, and Miguel Avellán, Titular Bishop of Siriensis, serving as co-consecrators. 
On 23 June 1636, he was appointed during the papacy of Pope Urban VIII as Bishop of Oviedo.
On 21 May 1641, he selected by the King of Spain and confirmed by Pope Urban VIII on 21 October 1641 as Bishop of Osma.
On 13 July 1653, he selected by the King of Spain and confirmed by Pope Innocent X on 10 November 1653 as Bishop of Córdoba.
He served as Bishop of Córdoba until his death on 13 April 1657.

References

External links and additional sources
 (for Chronology of Bishops)
 (for Chronology of Bishops)
 (for Chronology of Bishops) 
 (for Chronology of Bishops) 
 (for Chronology of Bishops) 
 (for Chronology of Bishops) 

17th-century Roman Catholic bishops in Spain
Bishops appointed by Pope Urban VIII
Bishops appointed by Pope Innocent X
1578 births
1657 deaths